In the 1985–86 Bahraini Premier League, Muharraq Club won the championship.

References
RSSSF

Bahraini Premier League seasons
Bah
1985–86 in Bahraini football